Oleksiy Boyko (born March 19, 1992) is a Ukrainian footballer who plays as a forward for FC Continentals.

Career

Crimea 
Boyko began playing at the youth level with Stal Alchevsk in 2007. He later transitioned into the amateur level in 2011 with Shakhtar Krasnyi Luch where he played for three seasons. In 2015, he joined the professional ranks by playing in the regional Crimean circuit with FC Kafa Feodosia. He resumed playing in the Crimean top tier by signing with FC Krymteplytsia Molodizhne. After several seasons in Molodizhne, he signed with league rivals PFC Kyzyltash Bakhchisaray in 2017.

Ukraine 
For the remainder of the 2017-18 season, he returned to his native Ukraine to play in the Ukrainian Second League with FC Myr Hornostayivka. In his debut season in the third tier, he appeared in 10 matches and recorded 4 goals. He re-signed with Hornostayivka the following season and throughout the season he was named the player of the week twice in the 5th and 23rd rounds of the season. He also finished the campaign as the league's top goal scorer with 19 goals. 

Following a successful season in the Ukrainian third tier, he played abroad in the Armenian First League with FC Lokomotiv Yerevan. After a brief stint in Armenia, he returned to Ukraine to play in the Ukrainian First League with FC Hirnyk-Sport Horishni Plavni. In 2020, remained in the second tier by signing with FC Kramatorsk where he appeared in five matches. After two seasons in the second division, he returned to the third tier to sign with SC Tavriya Simferopol. In his debut season with Tavriya, he was named the player of the week in the 25 round. He re-signed with Tavriya the following season. In his second season, he finished as the club's top goal scorer with 13 goals.

Canada  
In the summer of 2022, he went abroad for the second time to play in the Canadian Soccer League with FC Continentals. He made his debut on May 29, 2022, against the Serbian White Eagles where he recorded a goal. Throughout the season he helped the club secure a postseason berth by finishing fourth in the standings. He also finished as the club's top goal scorer with four goals and helped Continentals to win the CSL Championship by defeating Scarborough SC.

Honors 
FC Continentals

CSL Championship: 2022

References  
 

Living people
1992 births
Association football forwards
Ukrainian footballers
FC Krymteplytsia Molodizhne players
FC Kyzyltash Bakhchisaray players
FC Myr Hornostayivka players
FC Lokomotiv Yerevan players
FC Hirnyk-Sport Horishni Plavni players
FC Kramatorsk players
SC Tavriya Simferopol players
FC Continentals players
Crimean Premier League players
Ukrainian First League players
Ukrainian Second League players
Armenian First League players
Canadian Soccer League (1998–present) players
Footballers from Luhansk